HM LST-8 was a Landing Ship, Tank of the Royal Navy during World War II.

Post war she was transferred to the United States Navy before disposal.

Construction 
LST-8 was laid down on 26 July 1942, at Pittsburgh, Pennsylvania, by the Dravo Corporation; launched on 29 October 1942; sponsored by Mrs. Anne H. Johnson; and transferred to the Royal Navy on 22 March 1943, and commissioned the following day.

Service history 
LST-8 sailed from Hampton Roads, Virginia, for the Mediterranean on 14 May 1943, with convoy UGS 8A, arriving in Oran, Algeria, sometime before 8 June 1943.

She participated in the invasion of Sicily, landings at Reggio, the Salerno landings, and the Anzio landings, in the Mediterranean Theatre and the Normandy landings in the European Theatre. She was refitted at Liverpool in September 1944, and was transferred to the Eastern Fleet. LST-8 also participated in the landings in Malaya, Operation Zipper. She was paid off on 4 May 1946, at Subic Bay.

Final disposition
LST-8 was returned from the United Kingdom on 1 June 1946, and was struck from the Navy list on 3 July 1946. On 5 December 1947, she was sold to Bosey, Philippines.

References

Bibliography

External links

 

 

1942 ships
Ships built in Pittsburgh
LST-1-class tank landing ships of the Royal Navy
World War II amphibious warfare vessels of the United Kingdom
Ships built by Dravo Corporation